Scogin is a surname. Notable people with the surname include:

Forrest Scogin, American clinical psychologist
Josh Scogin (born 1981), American musician